San Mateo Creek can refer to two creeks in California:

San Mateo Creek (San Francisco Bay Area)
San Mateo Creek (Southern California)